Raymond Kintziger (23 December 1922 in Koblenz – 10 October 2010 in Arlon) was a Belgian athlete who competed in the 1952 Summer Olympics.

References

1922 births
2010 deaths
Belgian male discus throwers
Olympic athletes of Belgium
Athletes (track and field) at the 1952 Summer Olympics
Sportspeople from Koblenz
People from the Rhine Province